Luciano Valente de Deus (born 12 June 1981) is a Brazilian footballer.

External links
 

Living people
1981 births

Association football forwards

Brazilian footballers
Brazilian expatriate footballers
Paraná Clube players
Sport Club Internacional players
Iraty Sport Club players
Mogi Mirim Esporte Clube players
Daejeon Hana Citizen FC players
Gyeongnam FC players
Busan IPark players
Foolad FC players
Shahin Bushehr F.C. players
K League 1 players
Expatriate footballers in South Korea
Expatriate footballers in Iran
Sportspeople from Minas Gerais
Brazilian expatriate sportspeople in South Korea
Esporte Clube Internacional de Lages players